The textile industry in Taiwan is a major industry in Taiwan.

History
In 1949, Taiwan had 10,000 cotton spindles. In 1954, the Ministry of Economic Affairs established a committee to establish plans for textile industry. In 1964, it grew to 500,000, making the cotton textiles industry the fastest growing industry in Taiwan at that time. Decades later with the growing petrochemical industry, man-made fiber dominated the field.

In the 21st century Taiwan’s textile industry shifted towards technical textiles, a global market which Taiwan had captured 70% of by 2018.

Economy
As of 1965, the industry paid a total tax of NT$240 million to the government. In 2015, the total value of textile production in Taiwan was NT$409.3 billion. 

The export value of textile industries was US$44 million in 1963 in which 80% of it was cottons. Major exporting countries or regions were British Hong Kong, Iran, Latin America, South Korea, South Vietnam, Thailand, United Kingdom, United States. In 2015, textile exports amounted NT$10.8 billion and imports amounted NT$3.46 billion. In 2014, Taiwan was the 7th largest exporting countries for clothing products. Major importing countries or regions were Indonesia, Japan, United States and Vietnam. In 2019, Taiwan became the fourth largest surplus industry.

Factories
In 1965, Taiwan had 24 cotton textile mills. The numbers then grew to 4,300 in 2015. In 2019, there were roughly around 4,255 textile factories.

Production
Around 75% of domestic yarn production is used for clothing production.

Workforce
The textile industry employed around 35,000 people in 1965 and in 2015 it employed 140,000 people.

Research and development
The Taiwan Textile Research Institute is the government-funded research institute in Taiwan in textile industry.

References